Hélder Nuno Almeida Pereira Mota Lopes (born 25 June 1992), known as Mota, is a Portuguese footballer who plays for Berço SC in the Campeonato Nacional de Seniores, as a midfielder.

External links

1992 births
Living people
Sportspeople from Guimarães
Portuguese footballers
Association football midfielders
Liga Portugal 2 players
Campeonato de Portugal (league) players
F.C. Penafiel players
Rebordosa A.C. players
Juventude de Pedras Salgadas players
F.C. Felgueiras 1932 players
A.R. São Martinho players